Lewis and Clark High School is a four-year public secondary school in Spokane, Washington, United States. Opened in 1912, it is located at 521 W. Fourth Ave. in the Cliff/Cannon neighborhood of downtown Spokane, bounded by I-90 to the north and MultiCare Deaconess Hospital to the west. It replaced South Central High School, destroyed by fire in 1910, and was named for the two leaders of the Corps of Discovery.

History and facilities

1883–1908

Central School, a two-story wooden building, was the first school located on the southwest block at Fourth and Stevens. A four-room school, it opened  in October 1883. In 1890, citizens voted bonds to build a new high school and four elementary schools. The old Central school building was moved to the corner of Fifth and Bernard and became a private school. The new high school, first known as "Spokane High School," was constructed on the Fourth and Stevens site and opened in 1891. By 1906, the influx of immigrants and subsequent boom in Spokane's population created a need for a second high school. North Central High School was built and opened in 1908 to serve the students on the north side the river. Spokane High School became known as South Central High School.

South Central Fire
Fire destroyed South Central High School in 1910, shortly after sunrise on June 21. The blaze destroyed the interior of the school but left the remains of the exterior walls standing. In January 1911, citizens passed a bond issue of $500,000 to pay for replacement of the school. In a ceremony, former President Teddy Roosevelt laid the cornerstone of the school on April 8, 1911. Students attended classes at North Central while work progressed on the new school. Problems in construction and strikes by workers delayed the opening until April 1912. Meanwhile, the Spokane Daily Chronicle encouraged readers to enter a contest to suggest names for the new high school. Richard Hargreaves, the principal of North Central, suggested the names of Lewis and Clark, using one name for each high school, North and South Central. The school board settled for naming the south side school Lewis and Clark High School.

Renovation

Between 1999 and 2001 the school underwent a major renovation and addition.  This included addition of new classrooms to the east side of the school, replacement of the former field house with a new E. L. Hunter Field House, and a skybridge over S. Stevens Street to the east to connect the school building to the new field house. In 2020, a third complex with a commons and cafeteria was added with two floors of classrooms, connected to the west side of the main building.

In 2001, the school was added to the United States National Register of Historic Places and The Washington State Department of Archaeology and Historic Places.

Expansion
In 2019, work began on a $23.4 million addition to the school, adding eight classrooms, a commons area and a cafeteria. Prior to the construction of the cafeteria, students ate lunch in the hallways or would walk to a cluster of nearby fast food restaurants. This expansion was approved under the same bond that allowed for the replacement of Joe Albi Stadium with a smaller multiuse stadium.

Demographics
As of October 2007, 49% of the population was male and 51% of the population was female. White students have the biggest ethnic representation at 80.4% with African American follow at 6.2%, Asian/Pacific Islander at 3.0%, Hispanic at 3.0%, Asian at 2.6%, American Indian/Alaskan Native at 2.2%, and Pacific Islander at 0.4%. As of October 2007, 26.2% of students received free or reduced-priced meals, 8.0% were a part of the special education program, and 2.8% in transitional bilingual education. The 2006–2007 school year saw a dropout rate of 5.0%, an on-time graduation rate of 80%, and extended graduation rate of 84.4%.

Achievements
  Newsweek Magazine named Lewis and Clark High School one of the top 1500 US High Schools in 2009, 2008, 2007, 2006, and 2005.
 Sports Illustrated named Lewis and Clark High School one of the top 25 high school sports programs in the nation, ranking it 12th in 2007–08.

Notable alumni
Ed Bouchee – former MLB player (Philadelphia Phillies, Chicago Cubs, New York Mets)
Ed Brandt – former MLB player (Boston Braves, Brooklyn Dodgers, Pittsburgh Pirates)
Jesse Buchanan  – tenth president of the University of Idaho (1946–1954)
Abe Cohn - former football player for the University of Michigan
Erik Coleman – former National Football League player
Bill Etter – quarterback at the University of Notre Dame, and CFL player.
Neil Everett (Morfitt) – sportscaster for ESPN
Gail Cogdill - Former All-American, Pro-Bowl NFL Tight End, Detroit Lions
Briann January – WNBA basketball player with Indiana Fever
Carolyn Kizer – poet and Pulitzer Prize winner in 1985; studied with Joseph Campbell
Tom Kundig – architect
Julian Guthrie - journalist and author
Dan Lynch – former All-America college football player
Katherine Merck – first Miss Rodeo America from Washington State
Patrice Munsel – former opera singer and star with the Metropolitan Opera
Craig T. Nelson – actor, Coach, Parenthood
Scott O'Grady – former U.S. Air Force fighter pilot, famous for the Mrkonjić Grad incident
Carol Ohmart – actress and model
Matt Piedmont – Emmy winning writer, producer, director, and former Saturday Night Live staff writer
Jamie Redman – US National Rowing Team
Katelan Redmon – WNBA basketball player with New York Liberty
Dario Romero – former CFL player
Irwin Rose – Nobel Prize winner in chemistry in 2004.
Eva Silverstein – physicist 
Tom Sneva – former race car driver, Indianapolis 500 winner in 1983.
Jon Snyder – member of Spokane City Council and founder of Out There Monthly Magazine.
Jack Spring – former MLB player (Philadelphia Phillies, Boston Red Sox, Washington Senators, Los Angeles Angels, St. Louis Cardinals, Chicago Cubs, Cleveland Indians)

See also

 Education in Spokane, Washington
 National Register of Historic Places listings in Spokane County, Washington

References

External links

 
National Register of Historic Places file

School buildings on the National Register of Historic Places in Washington (state)
Schools in Spokane, Washington
High schools in Spokane County, Washington
Spokane Public Schools
Public high schools in Washington (state)
1912 establishments in Washington (state)
Educational institutions established in 1912
School buildings completed in 1912
National Register of Historic Places in Spokane, Washington